The Nogai Horde was a confederation founded by the Nogais that occupied the Pontic–Caspian steppe from about 1500 until they were pushed west by the Kalmyks and south by the Russians in the 17th century. The Mongol tribe called the Manghuds constituted a core of the Nogai Horde.

In the 13th century, the leader of the Golden Horde, Nogai Khan, a direct descendant of Genghis Khan through Jochi, formed an army of the Manghits joined by numerous Turkic tribes. A century later the Nogays were led by Edigu, a commander of Manghit paternal origin and Jochid maternal origin, who founded the Nogai dynasty.

In 1557, Nogai Nur-al-Din Qazi Mirza quarreled with Ismael Beg and founded the Lesser Nogai Horde on the steppe of the North Caucasus. The Nogais north of the Caspian were thereafter called the Great Nogai Horde. In the early 17th century, the Horde broke down further under the onslaught of the Kalmyks.

The Nogais north of the Black Sea were nominally subject to the Crimean Khanate rather than the Nogai Bey. They were divided into the following groups: Budjak (from the Danube to the Dniester), Yedisan (from the Dniester to the Bug), Jamboyluk (Bug to Crimea), Yedickul (north of Crimea) and Kuban. In particular, the Yedisans are mentioned as a distinct group, and in various locations.

Society

There were two groups of Nogais: those north of the Caspian Sea under their own Bey (leader), and those north of the Black Sea nominally subject to the Crimean Khan. The first group was broken up circa 1632 by the Kalmyks. The second shared the fate of the Khanate of Crimea.

The Nogai language was a form of Kypchak Turkic, the same language group as that of the neighboring Kazakhs, Bashkirs and Crimean and Volga Tatars. Their religion was Muslim, but religious institutions were weakly developed.

They were pastoral nomads grazing sheep, horses, and camels. Outside goods were obtained by trade (mostly horses and slaves), raiding, and tribute. There were some subject peasants along the Yaik river. One of the main sources of income for the Nogais was raiding for slaves, who were sold in Crimea and Bukhara. Hunting, fishing, caravan taxation, and seasonal agricultural migration also played a role, although this is poorly documented.

The basic social unit was the semi-autonomous ulus or band. Aristocrats were called mirza. The ruler of the Nogais was the Bey. The capital or winter camp was at Saraychik, a caravan town on the lower Yaik. From 1537 the second in rank was the Nur-al-Din, usually the Bey's son or younger brother and expected successor. The Nur-al-Din held the right bank along the Volga.  From the 1560s there was a second Nur-al-Din, a sort of a war chief. Third in rank was the Keikuvat, who held the Emba.

Political organization was fluid and much depended on personal prestige since as nomads, the Nogai subjects could simply move away from a leader who was disliked. Ambassadors and merchants were regularly beaten and robbed. Stealing horses, looked down upon in many cultures, was an important part of social and economic life on the steppe. Beys and Mirza's would often declare themselves vassals of some outside power, but such declarations had little meaning.

Slavery and raids

The Nogai Horde along with the Crimean Khanate raided settlements in Russia, Ukraine, Moldova, Romania, and Poland. The slaves were captured in southern Russia, Poland-Lithuania, Moldavia, Wallachia, and Circassia by Tatar horsemen in a trade known as the "harvesting of the steppe". In Podolia alone, about one-third of all the villages were destroyed or abandoned between 1578 and 1583. Some researchers estimate that altogether more than 3 million people were captured and enslaved during the time of the Crimean Khanate.

History

Decline of the Golden Horde
1299: Death of Nogai Khan, the Mongol ruler for whom the Nogays were named
1406–1419: Edigu, another subject and king-maker, founds Nogay dynasty
1438: Kazan Khanate founded
1449: Crimean Khanate founded
1452: Qasim Khanate founded. Beginning of Russian rule over Turkic Muslims
1465: Kazakh Khanate founded
1466: Astrakhan Khanate founded
1466: At this point the Golden Horde was left with only the steppe nomads, Sarai and some control over the caravan trade. The name "Great Horde" appears some time after this
1470s: Nogais hostile to Great Horde
1475: Ottomans take Kaffa from Genoese
1480–1519: Moscow and Crimea allied against Horde and Lithuania
1480: Ugra standoff: Horde fails in attack on Moscow. Approximate start of Russian independence from Tatars
1481: Nogais kill the Khan of the Great Horde in battle
1502: Crimeans destroy remnant of Golden Horde. Sarai destroyed

Independence
This data is from the English-language sources below. A long list of Nogai raids on Russia and Poland, from Russian sources, can be found at Crimean-Nogai raids.
c. 1509 Nogais move into lands vacated by Great Horde
1519 end of Moscow–Crimean alliance
1521 Nogais, driven west by the Kazakhs, cross the Volga and attack Astrakhan.   
c. 1522 Kazakhs capture Nogai capital
1523 Crimea briefly takes Astrakhan, but its army and Khan are destroyed by the Nogais.
1547 Ivan the Terrible, Grand Prince of Moscow, becomes the first Tsar of All Rus'. 
1552 Kazan annexed by Muscovy. Nogais lose tribute
c. 1550–1560 Crimean Tatars and Nogais again attack Ryazan land
1556 Astrakhan annexed by Muscovy. Nogais lose tribute 
1557 Mirza Kazy crosses the Volga and founds Small Horde along the Kuban 
1567–1571 Muscovite fort on the Terek, south of Nogais
1569 Ottomans and Crimeans with Small Horde fail to take Astrakhan 
1570s Kazakh pressure shifts Nogai trade away from Central Asia toward Moscow
1571 Russo-Crimean Wars (1571) Crimean–Nogai attack on Moscow. 100,000 horsemen. Moscow burned
1572 second raid fails.
1577 Crimean Tatars and Nogais continue to raid the southern Muscovite lands and lead Temnikov to ruins
1580/81 or 1577: Saraichick destroyed by renegade Cossacks
1582/83 Muscovite peace with Sweden and Polish–Lithuanian Commonwealth. 
1584 Crimean–Nogai pillage Ryazan land. Nogais capture "countless Slavic people".
1588 many Nogais move to Don. Very destructive fighting between Big and Small Hordes 
1593 Nogais operate in Voronezh and Livni 
1594 Nogais (up to 8 thousand) raid southern Muscovite lands. The enemy is besieged and Nogais storm the city.
1598 Moscow pushes fortifications south
1600 Moscow 'appoints' a Nogai Bey for the first time. Civil war among Nogais

Decline
1500–1850 Russian population expands southward and occupies forest-steppe and steppe. This is poorly documented
1605–1618 During the Time of Troubles so many captives were taken that the price of a slave at Kaffa dropped to fifteen or twenty gold pieces. Nogais ravage and burn many of the "Ukraine and Seversk" cities, towns, villages and suburbs, killing and taking prisoners from the locals.
1616 Raids on Russian borders by large numbers of Nogais
1617 Nogais and Azov Tatars invade southern Russia three times to plunder the village and capture prisoners.
1618 Nogais release 15,000 captives in peace treaty with Moscow.
1619 Isterek Bey dies. Civil war. Status of Beyship uncertain after this
1628 Crimean Tatars and Nogais begin to ravage the surrounding towns and villages of Poland, killing and capturing the local population.
1633 last Crimean–Nogai raid to reach the Oka
1634 major defeat of Nogais by Kalmyks
1637, 1641–1643: Raids by Nogais and Crimean nobles without permission of the Khan
1640 Crimean Tatars and Nogais terribly ravage Volhynia, Podolia and Galicia, taking a large number of captives.
1643 Kalmyks push back from Astrakhan
1664 Crimean Tatar and Nogai noblemen with their troops take part in the military campaign against the Polish king and devastate Livny and Bryansk counties
1693 Kalmyks attack Nogais, as agents of Russia
1699 Nogai forces continue to raid the southern Russian cities.
1711 20,474 Kalmyks and 4,100 Russians attack Kuban. They kill 11,460 Nogays, drown 5,060 others and return with 2,000 camels, 39,200 horses, 190,000 cattle, 220,000 sheep and 22,100 human captives, of whom only 700 are adult males. On the way home they meet and defeat a returning Nogai war party and free 2,000 Russian captives.
1720s 15,000 Nogai 'tents' flee Kalmyks for Kuban. 
1736–1739 Russians temporarily hold Azov
1770 Yedisans ally with Russia, blocking the land route from the Balkans to Crimea
1771 Exodus of Trans-Volga Kalmyks back to Dzungaria
1772 many Crimean Nogais accept Russian protection
1774 Crimea is proclaimed independent from the Ottoman Empire by the Russo-Ottoman Treaty of Küçük Kaynarca. The khanate increasingly falls under Russia's influence
1783 Crimea annexed by Russia; many Nogais move from lower Dnieper to Kuban
1783: Kuban Nogai Uprising: last attempt to resist
During the next 150 years, Black Sea grain ports assist massive southward expansion of Russian agriculture and population.
1783 – 19th century: Nogais east of the Black Sea push southeast to their present location
c. 1860 Several hundred thousand Muslims migrate from Russia to the Ottoman Empire
1928 Nogaysky District, Dagestan established
2002 Nogay population: 90,700
2007 Nogay District formed in Karachay-Cherkessia

Partial list of beys and mirzas
Temir Khan Nogai (1480): at Ugra standoff, 1481: assassinated Ahmed Khan.
Musa Mirza (died 1506): said to have 17 sons, among them:
Sheidiak (1521): defeated Astrakhan Khanate 1551: near Urgench
Mamay Khan (died 1549): Murdered the Crimean khan in 1523. 1530s: near Yaik, then near Kazan.  
Yosuf Khan (1549–1555): (on Yaik, anti-Moscow) circa 1535: near Kazan. 1549: helped Moscow against Kazan. 1551: near Yaik, broke with Moscow, claimed to have 300,000 horsemen and 8 sons. circa 1552: dissuaded from raid on Moscow. 1555: murdered by Araslan Mirza.
Ismail Khan Nogai (1555–1564) (on Volga, pro-Moscow) 1551: near Astrakhan. 1554: helped to take Astrakhan. 1555: sent 20,000 horses to Moscow 1555: Beg. 1556–57: Yosuf's sons (especially Yunus) seized his property. 1558: abandoned and starved, sent across Volga to buy food. 1560: tried to attack Crimea, blocked by Kazy Mirza
 Söyembikä of Kazan, daughter of Yosuf, widow of Kazan Khan, Moscow's captive
Arslan Mirza, son of Kuchum, killed Yosuf, Keikuvat under Ismael
Kazi Mirza (died 1577): son of Mamay. 1551: near Jaxartes. 1555: Nureddin under Ismael. circa 1557:  broke with Ismael when Ismael appoints Tin Ahmed his successor. Fled to Kuban, founding Small Horde. 1577: killed in war with Kabardians
Tin Ahmad (1564–1579): 1577 said to support raids on Moscow
Urus Khan Nogai (1579–1590): 1581 with Crimean Tatars attacked Moscow's frontiers. Killed in battle against the Small Horde
Ur Muhamed Khan (1590–1597) 
Tin Muhamed (1597–1600) 
Isterek (1600–1618): 1600: was installed by Russians at Astrakhan. 1613: was attacked by Kalmyks, fled to Caucasus, then Azov Sea region. Swore allegiance to both Russians and Turks, then made alliance with Poland, and received ambassadors from Persia, refused to be vassal of Crimea. 1616: was attacked by Crimea, sought Russian protection at Astrakhan. 1618: died under questionable circumstances
Kanai Khan (1622–1634)

See also
Turkic peoples
List of Turkic dynasties and countries
 List of Turkic states and empires
List of Sunni Muslim dynasties

Notes

References
 Khodarkovsky, Michael. Russia's Steppe Frontier, 2004
 Related books by Willard Sunderland (Taming the Wild Field), Alan W Fisher (Crimean Tatars), Martha Brill Olcott (Volga Tatars) and Khodarkovsky (1992 Where Two Worlds Met, on Kalmyks) can be found on Amazon.com and elsewhere.

1634 disestablishments
Tatar states
Early Modern history of Russia
States and territories established in the 1440s
States and territories disestablished in 1634
History of Ural
Khanates
Nogai people